The Far Side Gallery 3 is the third anthology of Gary Larson's The Far Side comic strips. Cartoons from previous collections Hound of the Far Side, The Far Side Observer, and Night of the Crash-Test Dummies are featured, all of which were printed from 1987 to 1989. The volume is dedicated to guitar maker Jimmy D'Aquisto, and the foreword was written by Stephen Jay Gould. The cover depicts a parody of Leonardo da Vinci's Mona Lisa, substituting a cow for the female subject.

1988 books
The Far Side